The Orulgan Range (Orulğan) is a range of mountains in far North-eastern Russia. Administratively the range is part of the Sakha Republic, Russian Federation.

History  
In 1932 Soviet geologist Ivan Atlasov, Professor of the Arctic and Antarctic Research Institute, carried out geological surveys in Yakutia. He explored and mapped most of the Orulgan Range between the 69th and 67th parallel north, correctly determining the direction and total length of the mountain chain.

Geography 
The Orulgan Range is the largest subrange of the Verkhoyansk Range system. It is located in its northern section, running along the main ridge, stretching southwards to the south of the Kharaulakh Range. The Dzhardzhan Range rises to the west and the Sietinden Range to the east, running in a roughly parallel direction, while the smaller Byrandia Range and Kuyellyakh Range rise in the southeast near its southern end.

It is an ultra-prominent summit, and one of the highest peaks of the Verkhoyansk Range.

Hydrography
The Orulgan Range is deeply cut by riverine intermontane basins with the Undyulyung, Uel Siktyakh, Begidyan, Sobolokh-Mayan, Menkere, Dzhardzhan, Byosyuke and other right tributaries of the Lena River flowing westwards. To the east flow the Omoloy and its Sietinde, Kuranakh-Yuryakh and Arga-Yuryakh left tributaries, as well as the Bytantay, a left tributary of the Yana River.

Flora

See also
List of mountains and hills of Russia
List of ultras of Northeast Asia
Orulganitidae

References

External links
Orulgan-Sis in Russian Federation
Ancient Middle-Carboniferous Flora of the Orulgan Range (Northern Verkhoyansk) and justification of Age Bylykat Formation
Verkhoyansk Range